AS Maya is a Burkinabé football club which plays in the Burkinabé Premier League.

Stadium
Currently the team plays at the 2000 capacity Stade de Bobo Dioulasso.

Football clubs in Burkina Faso